Ángel David Alvarado Santín (born October 10, 2000) is a Mexican athlete who competes in recurve archery. He is a 2019 Pan American Games bronze medalist in the mixed team recurve archery event.

References

2000 births
Living people
Mexican male archers
Sportspeople from Michoacán
Pan American Games bronze medalists for Mexico
Pan American Games medalists in archery
Archers at the 2019 Pan American Games
Medalists at the 2019 Pan American Games
21st-century Mexican people